Jean-Pierre Ohl (born 1959) is a French writer. He was born in Onesse-Laharie, a small village in the Landes forest in Southwest France. After studying literature he began working in independent bookstores. Thanks to his brother, the writer Michel Ohl, he discovered Charles Dickens who has had a great influence on his books and to whom he devoted a biography in 2011.

Works 
2004: Monsieur Dick ou Le Dixième Livre, Paris, Éditions Gallimard, 280 p. .
- Prix Emmanuel Roblès 2005
2008: Les Maîtres de Glenmarkie, Gallimard, 360 p. .
2011: Charles Dickens, Gallimard, series « Folio. Biographies », 305 p. .
2012: Redrum, Talence, France, Éditions de l’Arbre vengeur, 242 p. .

References

External links 
 Jean-Pierre Ohl on Babelio
 Jean-Pierre Ohl on France Culture
 Rencontre avec Jean-Pierre Ohl on Daily motion
 Jean-Pierre Ohl : Les Maîtres de Glenmarkie on Le Figaro (5 August 2008)

21st-century French novelists
Prix Emmanuel Roblès recipients
French biographers
1959 births
Living people